William Bernard Breda (April 6, 1927 – July 28, 2004) was a player for the Negro leagues. He played as an outfielder for the Kansas City Monarchs and the Birmingham Black Barons from 1950 to 1954. He was offered an opportunity to play in the Boston Braves farm system.

References

Further reading
 Jackson, Marion E. (May 20, 1950). Sports of the World. Atlanta Daily World. p. 5.
 "William Bernard Breda". The Baton Rouge Advocate. August 10, 2004.

1927 births
2004 deaths
Southern University alumni
Kansas City Monarchs players
Birmingham Black Barons players
Baseball outfielders
20th-century African-American sportspeople
21st-century African-American people